John Holloway (born 19 July 1948) is a British baroque violinist and conductor, currently based in Dresden, Germany. He is a pioneer of the early music movement.

Holloway was born in Neath, Wales, and studied in London at the Guildhall School of Music and Drama in London. After initial engagements, including at the Academy of St. Martin in the Fields and at the English Chamber Orchestra, he became manager and concertmaster of the Kent Opera Orchestra in the 1970s. After an encounter with Sigiswald Kuijken in 1972, he started playing the Baroque violin and gained a reputation as violinist, teacher and conductor in the field of historically informed performance.

In 1970 he became the concertmaster of Sir Roger Norrington's London Classical Players, and later Andrew Parrott's Taverner Consort and Players.  Besides playing in numerous Baroque orchestras, he is a noted musicologist and lecturer.

Holloway has taught at the Guildhall School of Music and Drama in London, the Schola Cantorum in Basel, and the Early Music Institute of Indiana University in Bloomington. He has given classes and led workshops in most European countries, as well as in Korea, New Zealand and the USA. In 2004, he was Regents’ Lecturer at UC Berkeley.

Between 2003 and 2005 Holloway served as musical director of the Indianapolis Baroque Orchestra, and in 2005 and 2006  concertmaster and music director of the period instrument ensemble and orchestra known as New Trinity Baroque.

In 2005 he founded jointly with Belgian conductor and harpsichordist  and a music agent the Mannheimer Hofkapelle, which in the summer of 2007 could be heard for the first time in 300 years with its original complement of 40 musicians.

Recordings 
Holloway has appeared on more than 100 CD recordings, and is the winner of a Gramophone Award in 1991 for his recording of Biber's Mystery Sonatas. He won two Danish Grammy Awards for his recordings of the chamber music and vocal music of Dieterich Buxtehude (1994 and 1997). His CD recordings of the Rosary Sonatas by Heinrich Ignaz Biber and of Sonatas Opus 5 of Jean-Marie Leclair won the Preis der Deutschen Schallplattenkritik ("German Record Critics' Award").  He has recorded Bach's sonatas and partitas for solo violin..  In addition to recordings of The Four Seasons and L'estro Armonico by Antonio Vivaldi, he recorded the complete chamber works of Georg Friedrich Händel with the ensemble L'Ecole d'Orphée he founded in 1975.

References

External links
 Official web site

English classical violinists
British male violinists
English conductors (music)
British male conductors (music)
Academic staff of the Hochschule für Musik Carl Maria von Weber
Baroque-violin players
Living people
British performers of early music
1948 births
People educated at Hitchin Boys' School
21st-century British conductors (music)
21st-century classical violinists
21st-century British male musicians
Male classical violinists